Quarber Merkur is a German language literary magazine of speculative fiction (science fiction, fantasy, etc.). It is published in Austria since 1963 and edited  by Franz Rottensteiner.

In 2004, on the occasion of the hundredth issue, Rottensteiner was awarded a special Kurd Laßwitz Award. (The nomination for special awards stated the occasion of 50 years of the journal.

References

External links

1963 establishments in Austria
Fantasy fiction magazines
German-language magazines
Magazines established in 1963
Speculative fiction magazines
Science fiction magazines established in the 1960s